Vamos a Cuba (Spanish, 'Let's Go to Cuba') is a children's book by Alta Schreier about Cuba.

Critics say that the book does not accurately represent life in the communist state. When Miami-Dade County Public Schools attempted to remove this book from the public school's library system the ACLU filed a lawsuit saying that it was a violation of the First Amendment.

A federal appeals court ruled that the Miami-Dade School Board did not violate the Constitution in 2006 when it removed a controversial children's book about Cuba from the public schools' library system.

In a 2-1 decision, the 11th Circuit Court of Appeals in Atlanta said the board did not breach the First Amendment, and ordered a Miami federal judge to lift a preliminary injunction that had allowed Vamos a Cuba to be checked out from school libraries.

The US Supreme Court declined to hear the legal challenge, so the book removal stands.

References

External links
WPLG news article
ACLU's legal argument

2001 children's books
Books about Cuba
Children's non-fiction books
American picture books
Spanish-language books